Manning Cabin Hollow is a valley in Bollinger and Wayne counties of the U.S. state of Missouri.

Manning Cabin Hollow took its name from the rustic cabin of one Mr. Manning, a pioneer citizen.

References

Valleys of Bollinger County, Missouri
Valleys of Wayne County, Missouri
Valleys of Missouri